Herceghalom is a village in Pest county, Budapest metropolitan area, Hungary. It has a population of 3,511 (2007).

References

External links 

Populated places in Pest County